Biocultural diversity is defined by Luisa Maffi, co-founder and director of Terralingua, as "the diversity of life in all its manifestations: biological, cultural, and linguistic — which are interrelated (and possibly coevolved) within a complex socio-ecological adaptive system." "The diversity of life is made up not only of the diversity of plants and animal species, habitats and ecosystems found on the planet, but also of the diversity of human cultures and languages." Research has linked biocultural diversity to the resilience of social-ecological systems. Certain geographic areas have been positively correlated with high levels of biocultural diversity, including those of low latitudes, higher rainfalls, higher temperatures, coastlines, and high altitudes. A negative correlation is found with areas of high latitudes, plains, and drier climates. Positive correlations can also be found between biological diversity and linguistic diversity, illustrated in the overlap between the distribution of plant diverse and language diverse zones. Social factors, such as modes of subsistence, have also been found to affect biocultural diversity.

Measuring biocultural diversity
Biocultural diversity can be quantified using QCUs (quantum co-evolution units), and can be monitored through time to quantify biocultural evolution (a form of coevolution). This methodology can be used to study the role that biocultural diversity plays in the resilience of social-ecological systems.  It can also be applied on a landscape scale to identify critical cultural habitat for Indigenous peoples.

Linguistic diversity
Cultural traditions are passed down through language, making language an important factor in the existence of biocultural diversity. There has been a decline in the number of languages globally. The Linguistic Diversity Index has recorded that between 1970 and 2005, the number of languages spoken globally has decreased by 20%. This decline has been especially observed in indigenous languages, with a 60% decline in the Americas, 30% in the Pacific, and 20% in Africa. Currently, there are 7,000 languages being spoken in the world. Half the population speaks only 25 of these languages, the top 5 in order being Mandarin, Spanish, English, Hindi, and Bengali. The remaining 6975 languages are divided between the other half of the population.
Because languages develop in a given community of speakers as that society adapts to its environment, languages reflect and express the biodiversity of that area. In areas of high biodiversity, language diversity is also higher, suggesting that a greater diversity in culture can be found in these areas. In fact, many of the areas of the world inhabited by smaller, isolated communities are also home to large numbers of endemic plant and animal species. As these people are often considered to be "stewards" of their environments, loss of language diversity means a disappearance of traditional ecological knowledge (TEK), an important factor in the conservation of biodiversity.

Declaration of Belem
Awareness about the balance between biological and cultural diversity has been increasing for a few decades. At the first international congress on ethnobiology in 1988, scientists met with indigenous peoples to discuss ways to better manage the use of natural resources and protect vulnerable communities around the world. They developed the Declaration of Belem, named after the city where the congress was held, which outlined eight steps to ensure conservation efforts would be implemented effectively.

Hotspots of biocultural diversity
There are three areas which have been identified as hotspots of biocultural diversity: The Amazon Basin, Central Africa, and Indomalaysia/Malenesia. Hot spots of biocultural diversity can be calculated by averaging a countries biological diversity and cultural diversity. Cultural diversity is scored based on "a country's language diversity, religion diversity, and ethnic group diversity". Recent programs in the Eastern Himalayas have also engaged this concept to promote conservation.

Biocultural conservation
In 2000, Ricardo Rozzi coined the term biocultural conservation to emphasize that “1) conservation biology issues involve [ontologically,
epistemologically, and ethically] both humans and other living beings, 2) biological and cultural diversity are inextricably integrated, and 3) social welfare and biocultural conservation go together” (p. 10). Then, Rozzi and collaborators proposed participatory approaches to biocultural conservation, identifying ten principles: 1) interinstitutional cooperation, (2) a participatory approach, (3) an interdisciplinary approach, (4) networking and international cooperation, (5) communication through the media, (6) identification of a flagship species, (7) outdoor formal and informal education, (8) economic sustainability and ecotourism, (9) administrative sustainability, and (10) research and conceptual sustainability for conservation. These principles were effective for establishing the Cape Horn Biosphere Reserve, Chile, at the southern end of the Americas, involving multiple actors, disciplines, and scales.

Biocultural restoration
Biocultural restoration endeavors to revive the many connections between cultures and the biodiversity they are founded on. This can be done in a larger effort to restore resilience in social-ecological systems. While some have questioned the conservation value of biocultural restoration, recent research has shown that such approaches can be in alignment with core conservation goals. The Hawaiian renaissance in Hawaii is held up as a global model for biocultural restoration within the scholarly literature on the topic.

See also

 Biocultural anthropology
 Biocultural evolution
 Conservation movement
 Cultural landscape
 Ecology
 Ecosystem
 Environmental protection
  Terralingua

References

External links
UNESCO web page on biocultural diversity
Terralingua
Biocultural Diversity Conservation

Biodiversity
Anthropology
Indigenous peoples and the environment